Shafiqur Rahman was a three-star rank Bangladesh Army officer who served as the Chief of General Staff of the Army until his retirement. He is the former Director General of Special Security Force (SSF), the agency in charge of protecting the Prime Minister of Bangladesh, and also served as Director of Military Operations (DMO) at Army Headquarters.

Early life and education
Shafiqur Rahman was born on 31 December 1962 in Shariatpur District, East Pakistan, Pakistan. He was commissioned in the Infantry Corps of the Bangladesh Army from the 11th BMA Long Course on 21 December 1984. Rahman completed OPCW Advance Course in the Netherlands, Junior Staff Course in Pakistan, Command & General Staff Course in the Philippines, and OPCW Basic Course in Romania. He graduated from the Defence Services Command and Staff College and completed the Army War Course at the National Defence College. He completed a master's degree in Defense Studies from National University of Bangladesh. He completed another Masters on War Studies from Bangladesh University of Professionals and received a Chancellor's Award for his masters work.

Career
Rahman has held a number of command positions in the Bangladesh Army. He was Infantry Battalion commander, Infantry Brigade commander of 71 Inf. Bde. of 9th Div. in Savar, and commanded three infantry divisions. He was the GOC of 55 Infantry Division and 19 Infantry Division and 24 Infantry Division. He served as the Director Military Operations (DMO) at Army Headquarters General Staff Branch. He was part of the Bangladesh contingent sent to the United Nations Operation in Somalia I.  He served in an infantry division as a Colonel Staff. He served as a Brigade Major. He served as the General Staff Officer (Operation) second class. He was the Private Secretary to the Principal Staff Officer of the Armed Forces Division. He was the General Staff Officer (Operations) of an independent infantry brigade. He was an instructor in the Bangladesh Military Academy and the School of Infantry and Tactics. He was a senior instructor in the Defense Services Command and Staff College. He was Bangladesh's Senior Military Liaison Officer in the Headquarters of the United Nations in New York City. In 2015 he served as the Chittagong Area Commander. He was appointed the Director General of Special Security Force on 10 April 2016. On 28 July 2018 he was promoted to Lt Gen and appointed as the Chief of general staff of the army leaving Maj Gen Mojibur Rahman as the Director General of SSF.

Post retirement 
After retirement he became Director of National Bank Limited nominated by Shikder Insurance Company Ltd.

References

Living people
Bangladesh Army generals
1962 births
People from Shariatpur District
National Defence College (Bangladesh) alumni